Lai Kok is one of the 25 constituencies of the Sham Shui Po District Council. The seat elects one member of the council every four years. The boundary is loosely based on the area of Lai Kok Estate.

Councillors represented

Election results

2010s

2000s

1990s

References

2011 District Council Election Results (Sham Shui Po)
2007 District Council Election Results (Sham Shui Po)
2003 District Council Election Results (Sham Shui Po)
1999 District Council Election Results (Sham Shui Po)
 

Constituencies of Hong Kong
Constituencies of Sham Shui Po District Council
1994 establishments in Hong Kong
Constituencies established in 1994